Foro Penal is a Venezuelan human rights organization that provides legal assistance pro bono to people subject of arbitrary detentions and their relatives. The organization is composed of regional coordinators for each state in Venezuela, pro bono lawyers on a national level and a network of over five thousand volunteers, non-lawyer activists, known as "active defensors".

Structure 
Foro Penal is constituted as a civil association composed of regional coordinators for each state in Venezuela, pro bono lawyers on a national level and a network of over five thousand volunteers, non-lawyer activists, known as "active defensors". The directive board is made up of Alfredo Romero, director president, Gonzalo Himiob, director vicepresident.

The organization publishes reports documenting the number of arbitrary detentions and political prisoners in Venezuela, figures that are certified by the Organization of American States.

History

Lawyers Alfredo Romero and Gonzalo Himiob founded the non-governmental organization Víctimas Venezolanas de Violaciones a los Derechos Humanos (VIVE) as a response to human rights violations that occurred after the Llaguno Overpass events in Caracas on 11 April, 2002. The Penal Forum was the first organization to go to the newly founded International Criminal Court to denounce that crimes against humanity were being committed in Venezuela.

Alfredo Romero, spokesman for the organization, informed that Venezuela was the only Latin American country that refused to receive the IACHR along with Cuba. Foro Penal estimated that by that time 2,200 people had been charged for participating in protests, including 500 students.

Foro Penal estimated that between 4 February and 22 October 2014, there were 3383 arbitrary arrests related to protests in the country. The organization also denounced and documented torture during the protests, including beatings and electric shocks. By the end of April of that year it had documented 70 cases of abuse against detainees; Gonzalo Himiob stated that the abuses were continuous and systematic, and that the mistreatment of prisoners was very similar in all parts of the country. Due to the "meticulous" documentation of human rights violations committed during the 2014 protests and for showing them to the international community, the United States Department of State awarded its annual Human Rights Defender Award to Foro Penal. By this date the NGO had a national network of more than 200 pro bono lawyers and 1 000 human rights activists. Foro Penal has also represented Marvinia Jiménez, who was attacked by officers of the Bolivarian National Guard that year.

The NGO requested precautionary protection measures before the IACHR in favor of Lorent Saleh and Gerardo Carrero, imprisoned in the Bolivarian Intelligence Service's La Tumba, asking the organization to require the Venezuelan government to protect their life and personal integrity. The IACHR granted these measures on 2 March 2015.

In 2017, Foro Penal published a joint report with Human Rights Watch documenting arbitrary detentions, torture, and excessive use of force during the 2017 Venezuelan protests. Between January 1 and October 31, the organization documented 5,511 arrests for political purposes, the highest number of detainees in a year. A report prepared by the organization along with the Robert F. Kennedy Center for Human Rights documented that 200 cases of enforced disappearances in 2018 increased to 524 in 2019, attributed to an increase in protests. The analysis concluded that the average disappearance lasted five days, suggesting that the government wanted to avoid the scrutiny that could come with large-scale, long-term detentions.

Among the political prisoners represented by Foro Penal are Alejandro Peña Esclusa, Lorent Saleh, Karen Palacios and Salvador Franco, among others. In 2018 Foro Penal released a documentary on the history of the organization, "Que se haga justicia. La historia del Foro Penal en Venezuela".

By 2021, both Alfredo Romero and Gonzalo Himiob were accredited as counsel at the International Criminal Court.

Attacks 
In 2008, Mónica Fernández suffered an attack in which she was shot in the back. Despite being shot very close to her spine she did not suffer major injuries.

Alfredo Romero has been criminalized several times by state officials and in media programs, particularly in Diosdado Cabello's Con El Mazo Dando, has received death threats, has been harassed in national airports and has denounced the intervention of Foro Penal's communications without a warrant. Romero has a cautelary protection measure issued by the Inter-American Commission of Human Rights in 17 March 2015.

During a 2017 interview by Spanish journalist  in the program Salvados, Nicolás Maduro accused Foro Penal of being financed by the United States, as well as other organizations such as Transparency International and Caritas, and of being "directed by delinquents".

Awards 
Foro Penal has been awarded several times both in Venezuela and abroad, including the award given by the United States government in July 2015, the condecoration to Foro Penal in Zulia state by the State Lawyers Association in August 2015 and the award given by the Barcelona Lawyers Association, Spain, in February 2016. The organization's director, Alfredo Romero, was awarded the Robert F. Kennedy Human Rights Award in 2017. The organization has been nominated for the Nobel Peace Prize in 2015 and 2016.

See also 

 PROVEA
 Un Mundo Sin Mordaza
 Venezuelan Observatory of Social Conflict

References

External links 
Official website

Organizations established in 2005
Human rights organizations based in Venezuela
2014 Venezuelan protests
2017 Venezuelan protests